Julieta Cantaluppi (born 24 January 1985, in Como) is a retired Italian rhythmic gymnast and currently a coach in rhythmic gymnastics.

Career 
Julieta's mother Kristina Guiourova (who is also her coach) competed in rhythmic gymnastics for Bulgaria and was world champion with rope in London in 1979. She competed in the individual all-around event at the 2012 Summer Olympics, where she placed 16th.

Julieta speaks Italian, Bulgarian and French. Nowadays, Cantaluppi is coaching successful Italian rhythmic gymnasts Milena Baldassarri (2018 World Ribbon silver medalist, 6th at the Tokyo Olympics), Talisa Torretti (2018 Youth Olympic Games AA bronze medalist) and Sofia Raffaeli (2022 five-times World champion, two times European champion).

References

1985 births
Living people
Italian rhythmic gymnasts
Olympic gymnasts of Italy
Gymnasts at the 2012 Summer Olympics
Sportspeople from Como
Gymnasts of Centro Sportivo Aeronautica Militare
Mediterranean Games gold medalists for Italy
Competitors at the 2009 Mediterranean Games
Mediterranean Games medalists in gymnastics
Italian people of Bulgarian descent
21st-century Italian women